Sivadavalasa is a village and panchayat in Bobbili mandal, Vizianagaram district of Andhra Pradesh, India.

See also 
Bobbili mandal

Villages in Vizianagaram district